Concession and Agreement (full title: The Concession and Agreement of the Lords Proprietors of the Province of New Caesarea, or New Jersey, to and With All and Every the Adventurers and All Such as Shall Settle or Plant There) was a 1664 document that provided religious freedom in the colony of New Jersey. It was issued as a proclamation for the structure of the government for the colony written in 1664 by the two proprietors, Lord John Berkeley and Sir George Carteret. The document promised religious freedom to all inhabitants of New Jersey, and also declared that the proprietors would be in charge of appointing the provincial governors. The first such governor to be appointed was Philip Carteret. 

The goal of the document was to entice more settlers to farm in New Jersey, so that the two proprietors could earn more profit by collecting quit-rents, annual fees paid on granted lands. To encourage such settlement, they allowed religious freedom, which was not available underneath the English government.

See also
Colonial history of New Jersey
Elizabethtown
Elizabethtown Tract
East Jersey
West Jersey
List of colonial governors of New Jersey

External links

Text of the Concession and Agreement
West Jersey Proprietors Meeting House

Legal history of New Jersey
Pre-statehood history of New Jersey
History of the Thirteen Colonies
Government documents
1665 in New Jersey